Fuipiano Valle Imagna is a comune (municipality) in the Province of Bergamo in the Italian region of Lombardy, located about  northeast of Milan and about  northwest of Bergamo.

Fuipiano Valle Imagna borders the following municipalities: Brumano, Corna Imagna, Gerosa, Locatello, Taleggio, Vedeseta.

Demographic evolution

External links 
  Pro Loco Fuipiano Imagna

References